Tanfield may refer to:

People
Charlie Tanfield (born 1996), British racing cyclist
Elizabeth Tanfield (1585–1635), English poet and dramatist
Francis Tanfield (1565–?), Proprietary Governor of the South Falkland colony in Newfoundland
Lawrence Tanfield, English lawyer and politician
Peter Tanfield (born 1961), British violinist

Places
Tanfield, County Durham, a village in County Durham, England
East Tanfield, a civil parish in North Yorkshire, England
West Tanfield, a village in North Yorkshire, England

Other
Tanfield Group, a manufacturer of electric trucks and work platforms based in the United Kingdom
Tanfield Railway, a tourist attraction in County Durham, England
Tanfield School, County Durham, England
Tanfield Valley, archaeological site on Baffin Island

See also